Rockford High School  in Rockford, Michigan services grades 10-12 for the Rockford Public Schools. The freshman center is next door at 4500 Kroes Street. The current high school was built in 1992.

The Rockford Marching Band, the largest competitive band in the state of Michigan, will be performing in the 2023 Rose Parade in Pasadena, California.

Demographics
The demographic breakdown of the 1,878 students enrolled in 2013-14 was:
Male - 52.3%
Female - 47.7%
Native American/Alaskan - 0.1%
Asian/Pacific islanders - 1.8%
Black - 0.8%
Hispanic - 3.2%
White - 91.3%
Multiracial - 2.8%

8.5% of the students were eligible for free or reduced lunch.

Athletics
The Rockford Rams compete in the Ottawa-Kent Conference. The school colors are orange and black. The following sports are offered:

Baseball (boys)
State champion - 2011
Basketball (girls & boys)
Boys state champion - 2003
Bowling (girls & boys)
Competitive cheer (girls)
Cross country (girls & boys)
Boys state champion - 2000, 2002, 2014, 2015 
Girls state champion - 1998, 1999, 2000, 2001, 2002
Equestrian*
E-sports
Football (boys)
State champion - 2004, 2005, 2008
Golf (girls & boys)
Gymnastics (girls)
State champion - 1989
Ice hockey (boys)
Lacrosse (girls & boys)
Girls state champion - 2010, 2013, 2014, 2015, 2016, 2017, 2018, 2019 
Rowing (girls & boys)
Rugby-2022 State Champion
Boys National champion - 2016
Girls State champion - 2011, 2012, 2013, 2017, 2018
Skiing (girls & boys)
Soccer (girls & boys)
Softball (girls)
Swimming and diving (girls & boys)
Boys state champion - 2001
Tennis (girls & boys)
Track and field (girls & boys)
Girls state champion - 2000, 2003
Volleyball (girls)
State champion - 2011
Water polo** (girls & boys)
Boys state champion - 2000, 2003, 2004, 2005, 2006, 2007, 2009, 2010, 2012, 2017
Girls state champion - 2004, 2006, 2008, 2012
Wrestling (boys)
State champion - 2007, 2009

*Equestrian events are sanctioned by the Michigan Interscholastic Horsemanship Association (MIHA).

**Water polo is sanctioned by the Michigan Water Polo Association (MWPA).

All other events are sanctioned by the MHSAA.

Notable alumni
 Brent Bookwalter - professional cyclist
 Ben Braden - NFL player
 Parker Ehinger - National Football League (NFL) offensive lineman
 Jason Hartmann - long distance runner
 Adam Kieft - NFL offensive lineman
 Dathan Ritzenhein - long distance runner
 Joe Staley - NFL offensive tackle
 Ginger Zee - television meteorologist

References

External links
 

Public high schools in Michigan
Educational institutions established in 1993
Schools in Kent County, Michigan
1993 establishments in Michigan